is a Japanese tokusatsu series that serves as the 12th installment in the Kamen Rider franchise and the third entry in the Heisei era. The series follows idealist journalist Shinji Kido as he attempts to stop the violent Rider War from claiming more innocent lives than it already has.

Main characters

Shinji Kido
 is a kind-hearted, friendly, simple, and naive idealist who works at the ORE Journal as a journalist trainee until he finds one of Shiro Kanzaki's Card Decks, encounters the Asian dragon-like Mirror Monster , and stumbles into the Mirror World while investigating Koichi Sakakibara's disappearance. Despite being told to stay out of the Rider War by Ren Akiyama, Shinji chooses to join anyway to stop the other Mirror Monsters from devouring people and stop the Rider War, forming a contract with Dragreder and becoming Kamen Rider Ryuki in the process. By the series finale, he dies protecting civilians from a pack of Mirror Monsters, but Shiro reverses the Rider War's events, resurrecting its participants and allowing them to resume their normal lives.

With the  card, he can transform further into  and evolve Dragreder into , giving it the ability to transform into a motorcycle. In this form, he wields the  firearm, which can convert into the  sword and allow him to perform the  finisher alongside Dragranzer.

Ren Akiyama
 is a cold loner who fights constantly and is frequently unemployed. Sometime prior to the series, he joined Shiro Kanzaki's Rider War to revive his fiancé, Eri Ogawa, who fell into a coma following an encounter with the bat-like Mirror Monster , who he formed a contract with to become . Despite initial reluctance, he befriends Shinji Kido and fights alongside him to stop Mirror Monsters and malicious Rider War competitors until Shinji gives his life saving civilians. Ultimately, Ren faces the last participant, Kamen Rider Odin, in combat until Shiro's sister Yui dies, causing Odin to fade away. Despite becoming the winner by default, Shiro reverses the Rider War, leading to Ren becoming a full-time employee at the Atori coffee shop while Eri is revived in the new timeline.

In combat, Ren wields the  rapier, which allows him to summon Darkwing, the  lance, and illusionary copies of himself as well as perform the  finisher with the appropriate Advent Cards. With the  card, Ren can transform into  and evolve Darkwing into , granting it the ability to transform into a motorcycle.

Yui Kanzaki
 is a young caring woman who had been aiding Ren prior to the series to locate her long-lost brother Shiro Kanzaki. While investigating Shiro's disappearance over the course of the series, she discovers the drawings they made as children served as the basis for the Mirror World's monsters and that, due to their neglectful parents, the real Yui died and allowed her Mirror World counterpart to inhabit her body. Due to being unable to survive outside of the Mirror World, the doppelganger will die on Yui's twentieth birthday, which led to Shiro developing the Rider War in the hopes of saving her. Having repressed these memories, Yui remains unaware of them until the present. Despite Shiro, Ren, and Shinji Kido's best efforts, the Mirror World Yui fades from existence short of the deadline, though her spirit appears before Shiro to tell him she did not want him to save her in the manner he wanted, inspiring him to reverse the Rider War's events.

In an alternate ending depicted in the film Kamen Rider Ryuki: Episode Final, the lonely Yui had met and befriended Shinji as children, but he seemingly abandoned her despite promising not to. Yui was invited by her Mirror World counterpart to play with her, only to learn she will immediately die if she returns to the real world. Yui's doppelganger loaned the original her lifespan, which will last until her twentieth birthday, in exchange for Yui and Shiro's drawings. After joining Ren and Shinji in their fight against the Mirror Monsters in the present, Yui eventually dies, though an angered Shiro does not end the Rider War.

Shiro Kanzaki
 is a mysterious scientific genius and Yui's older brother who was taken to live with relatives in America thirteen years prior to the series. In reality, he merged with his Mirror World counterpart to survive in the Mirror World. By the series finale, Shiro allows Yui to die and honors her dying wish of reversing time to avert the Rider War.

Kamen Rider Zolda
 is a Rider moniker specialized in long-range combat aided by the robotic Minotaur-like Contract Monster .

In combat, Zolda wields the  submachine gun, which allows them to summon Magnugiga, the upper back-mounted , the  missile launcher, and the  shield as well as perform the  finisher alongside Magnugiga with the appropriate Advent Cards.

Shuichi Kitaoka
 is a self-proclaimed "super-lawyer" who tends to only help someone if he has something to gain from them and was diagnosed with terminal cancer. With months left to live, he joins Shiro Kanzaki's Rider War as Kamen Rider Zolda with the hopes of achieving immortality and continuing his extravagant lifestyle. However, his condition leaves him vulnerable to fainting spells and dizziness, which eventually forces him to ask his secretary and bodyguard, Goro Yura, to take his place as Zolda during the Rider War's final stages.

In an alternate ending depicted in the film Kamen Rider Ryuki: Episode Final, Kitaoka forfeits the Rider War due to his declining health.

During the events of the crossover film Kamen Rider × Super Sentai: Ultra Super Hero Taisen, the Game World version of Kitaoka transforms into the green-colored , a hybrid of Midorenger and the Double Riders. In this form, he commands the Gokaigers' Gokai Galleon.

Goro Yura
 is Kitaoka's loyal secretary, bodyguard, and a former client of his who is highly skilled with household work and hand-to-hand combat. Aware of Kitaoka's activities as Kamen Rider Zolda, Goro assists him as much as possible. Due to Kitaoka's cancer, Goro takes over as Zolda to face Takeshi Asakura, dying in the process before Shiro Kanzaki reverses the Rider War's events.

Takeshi Asakura
 is a sadistic, arrogant, and bad-tempered criminal with a reputation for loving the act of fighting and killing during his fits of rage after he murdered his entire family as a child. After being represented by Shuichi Kitaoka, who ensured Asakura would remain in prison, the latter joined Shiro Kanzaki's Rider War to satisfy his destructive nature and formed a contract with the giant cobra-like Mirror Monster , becoming . With his newfound powers, Asakura breaks out of jail to seek revenge on Kitaoka upon learning of the latter's participation in the Rider War. After receiving Ren Akiyama's help in faking his death to stop the police from interfering with his activities, Asakura kills Kamen Riders Raia and Gai and takes their Contract Monsters as his own. However, the police eventually learn the truth, forcing Asakura to settle his grudge against Kitaoka in a final battle, only to learn his opponent had switched places with Goro Yura, leaving the criminal in disarray over being denied the thing he wanted most before the police kill him. After Shiro reverses the Rider War, Asakura is revived, out of prison, and gone into hiding.

In an alternate ending depicted in the film Kamen Rider Ryuki: Episode Final, Asakura battles Kamen Rider Femme, who seeks revenge on him for her older sister's murder, before he loses Genocider to Kamen Rider Ryuga and Femme destroys his Card Deck, leaving Asakura to dissolve in the Mirror World. In the web-exclusive special Kamen Rider Brave: Survive! The Revived Beast Rider Squad, Foundation X revives this version of Asakura in an artificial body.

After killing Raia and Gai, Asakura can use their Advent Cards, fuse their respective Contract Monsters Evildiver and Metalgelas with Venosnaker to create the chimeric Contract Monster , and perform the  finisher alongside it. In the web-exclusive series Kamen Rider Outsiders, with the Survive Mugen card, Asakura can transform into  and evolve Venosnaker into its evolved form, granting it the ability to transform into a motorcycle. In this form, he wields the  firearm, which resembles Ryuki Survive's Drag Visor Zwei.

Recurring characters

ORE Journal
 is an online journal resource where Shinji Kido worked as a journalist trainee.
: The editor and Shinji's senior at the ORE Journal.
: A no-nonsense journalist whose goal is to uncover the truth behind the disappearances linked to the Rider War and the target of Shuichi's unwanted affections.
: A systems operator for the ORE Journal.
: Shuichi's strong yet clumsy former secretary who is later hired as a journalist for ORE Journal.

Sanako Kanzaki
 is Shiro and Yui's aunt and owner of the  coffee shop who considers herself a wise woman, claiming that her intuition is never wrong.

Miyuki Tezuka
 is a mysterious and enigmatic fortune teller who believes in predestination. While he was not originally chosen to take part in Shiro Kanzaki's Rider War, he did so after his pianist friend  was attacked by Takeshi Asakura, declined Shiro's offer, and devoured by a Mirror Monster. Forming a contract with the stingray-like Mirror Monster  and becoming , Tezuka seeks to avenge Yuichi by ending the Rider War, joining forces with Ren Akiyama and Shinji Kido in the process. After receiving a Survive Card from Shiro and passing it to Ren, Tezuka foresees Shinji's death at Asakura's hands. Choosing to defy fate, Tezuka sacrifices himself to save Shinji, taking the fatal blow meant for him in his place. After Shiro reverses the Rider War's events during the series finale, Tezuka is revived with no memory of his participation in it.

In an alternate timeline depicted in Kamen Rider Ryuki Special: 13 Riders, Tezuka joined the Rider War to help his former lover, Eri Ogawa, but is killed by Kamen Rider Verde.

Jun Shibaura
 is an arrogant and manipulative second-year college student at Meirin University, member of the schools Matrix gaming club, and son of a company president who is well-versed in computers and programming. Seeing everyone around him as pawns he can toy with to amuse himself, Shibaura joins the Rider War simply to win it, forming a contract with the anthropomorphic rhinoceros-like Mirror Monster  and becoming  in the process. Following a failed attempt at taking over the ORE Journal and serving jail time before his father and Shuichi Kitaoka bail him out, Shibaura learns Kamen Riders Ryuki, Knight, and Raia's identities and invites them to a party in the hopes of killing them. However, they get caught in a battle between Kamen Riders Zolda and Ouja, with the latter using Shibaura as a human shield to survive Zolda's finishing attack, killing Shibaura.

In an alternate timeline depicted in Kamen Rider Ryuki Special: 13 Riders, Shibaura conspires with Kamen Rider Verde to kill Ryuki, only to be attacked by Kamen Rider Odin and devoured by a Mirror Monster.

In combat, Shibaura possesses the left shoulder-mounted , which allows him to summon Metalgelas and the  gauntlet as well as perform the  finisher in conjunction with them with the appropriate Advent Cards.

Kamen Rider Odin
 is a mysterious golden entity and sentient Card Deck who serves as Shiro Kanzaki's representative in the Rider War and Yui's guardian via host bodies and assistance from the phoenix-like Contract Monster . Throughout the Rider War, Odin makes brief appearances to fight the other Kamen Riders until he and Knight are left. After a climactic battle however, Odin disappears after Shiro sees the pointlessness of the Rider War upon Yui's death.

Years later, during the events of Rider Time: Kamen Rider Ryuki, Odin resurfaced in a new host to commence a new Rider War through Tatsuya Kanō and his grievously injured girlfriend Sara in an attempt to revive Yui. Once Tatsuya is defeated by Kamen Rider Zi-O, Odin makes his presence known while using the Survive cards to overpower Zi-O and Geiz before they used the Ryuki and Knight Ride Watches to negate his invincibility and defeat him. But Odin returns during the events of Kamen  Rider Outsiders, facing Ohja before being defeated by him.

Additionally, he can teleport short distances, produce golden feathery gusts, and possesses the  card, which renders him invincible when used in conjunction with the Survive Shippu and Rekka cards.

Satoru Tojo
 is a bloodthirsty and mentally unstable social outcast who developed hero syndrome and will do whatever it takes to be accepted, going as far as to kill his loved ones under the belief that the resulting grief will make him stronger. After joining the Rider War, forming a contract with the anthropomorphic white tiger-like Mirror Monster , and becoming , Tojo initially aids his teacher Hideyuki Kagawa in closing the Mirror World before killing him in a twisted attempt at vindicating Kagawa's ideals about heroism. However, Tojo fell into a downward spiral of contradictions throughout the Rider War until he witnesses a father and son, who reminded Tojo of Kagawa and his own child, and sacrifices himself to save them from a vehicular accident. The next day, the newspaper would run the story of Tojo's deed, labeling him a hero. After Shiro reverses the Rider War's events, Tojo is revived with no memory of it.

In combat, Tojo wields the  battle axe, which allows him to summon Destwilder and the  gauntlets as well as perform the  finisher in conjunction with them with the appropriate Advent Cards.

Mitsuru Sano
 is the son of a wealthy businessman, who sent him out into the world to learn about life's hardships to avoid spoiling him with an affluent upbringing. As a result, Sano became a parking garage worker who cleans cars for other wealthy individuals and developed the belief that  friendship, respect, and love could be bought. As a result, he joined the Rider War, formed a contract with an anthropomorphic gazelle-like Mirror Monster subspecies called , and became  to live a rich and happy life. To achieve his goal, he becomes a mercenary, attempting to sell his strength to his fellow competitors. After attaining his father's inheritance and losing his reason to fight however, Sano discovers he cannot back out of the Rider War and attempts to buy the other Riders' services in the hopes that they will fight for him. This leads to him forming an alliance with Satoru Tojo, who eventually and literally backstabs him and leaves him for dead before Kamen Rider Ouja destroys his Card Deck, leaving Sano to dissolve in the Mirror World.

In combat, Sano possesses the right knee-mounted , which allows him to summon Gigazelles, among other Zelle-type Mirror Monsters, and the  double drill gauntlet as well as perform the  finisher alongside the Zelles with the appropriate Advent Cards.

Alternatives
The  are a pair of  created by Hideyuki Kagawa, based on Shiro Kanzaki's blueprints for the 13 Kamen Riders, who seek to close the Mirror World with assistance from the robotic, anthropomorphic cricket-like Mirror Monster . Following the Alternatives' deaths, Psycorogue is destroyed by Kamen Rider Knight.

Unlike the other Riders, the Alternatives utilize altered V-Buckles and Card Decks to transform. In combat, they possess the  brace, which allows them to summon Psycorogue and the  sword, transform the former into the  motorcycle, and perform the  finisher alongside Psycorogue with the appropriate Advent Cards.

: A graduate student at Seimeiin University who originally worked under Professor Hitoshi Ejima, though Nakamura was sick the day Ejima and Shiro Kanzaki began their Mirror World-related experiments. Upon learning of what happened, Nakamura developed a grudge against the Kanzakis, studiously evaded questions related to them and Ejima, and eventually joined Professor Hideyuki Kagawa in his effort to stop the Rider War as the primary Alternative. However, Nakamura is killed by Satoru Tojo, who discovered the former only sought to stop the Rider War for vengeful reasons.

: A professor at Seimeiin University who discovered Shiro Kanzaki's notes on the latter's Mirror World experiments. Realizing how dangerous it was and despite not fully understanding it himself, the former used his photographic memory to duplicate the latter's work and develop the Alternative technology in an effort to close the Mirror World. Kagawa also recruited Satoru Tojo and Hajime Nakamura to help him further, becoming the prototypical  along the way. However, he is killed by Tojo due to the latter's hero syndrome.

Guest characters
: A young man and intended participant of the Rider War who lived in the apartment where Shinji Kido became Kamen Rider Ryuki and was eaten by Dragreder prior to the series' beginning. In an alternate timeline depicted in Kamen Rider Ryuki Special: 13 Riders, Sakakibara was Shinji's predecessor as Ryuki before passing his Card Deck to him and dissolving in the Mirror World.
: Ren Akiyama's fiancé who ended up hospitalized and in a coma after being attacked by Darkwing.
: A corrupt police officer who uses his job to cover his illegal activities and eliminate witnesses to his crimes. After killing his partner and antique shop owner, for demanding a larger cut from his profits, Sudo was approached by Shiro Kanzaki and offered to participate in the Rider War. Gladly accepting, Sudo formed a contract with the anthropomorphic crab-like Mirror Monster  and became  to better facilitate his crimes by feeding his victims to his Contract Monster. In combat, Sudo possesses the left arm-mounted  shears, which allows him to summon Volcancer, the  gauntlet and the  shield as well as allow him to perform the  finisher alongside Volcancer with the appropriate Advent Cards. In the present, he hospitalizes Reiko Momoi after she starts investigating Kaga's shop. When Shinji is assigned to the case, he tries to befriend Sudo, believing he is Kaga, and inadvertently reveals personal details about himself and his allies. Using this information, Sudo attempts to kill his competitors and kidnap Yui to gain leverage over Shiro, but Ren realizes Sudo's true identity and damages his Card Deck. With the contract null and void, Volcancer turns on Sudo, devouring him like it did his victims. In an alternate timeline depicted in Kamen Rider Ryuki Special: 13 Riders, Sudo conspires with Kamen Rider Verde to kill Shinji, only to be killed by Kamen Rider Ouja.
: A former professor at Seimeiin University who helped Shiro perform the experiment that resulted in Eri Ogawa's coma. Following this, Ejima left his job and wandered the city with a Seal Card to protect himself from the Mirror Monsters. After losing the card, he returns to his lab to beg for Shiro's help, only to die of a heart attack upon seeing Yui.

Spin-off exclusive characters

Miho Kirishima
 is a young con artist who seduces wealthy men to steal their valuables and appears exclusively in the film Kamen Rider Ryuki: Episode Final. She joins the Rider War to resurrect her sister and take revenge on her killer, Takeshi Asakura, forming a contract with the swan-like Mirror Monster  to become  and falling in love with Shinji Kido in the process. While she succeeds in defeating Asakura, she is killed by Mirror Shinji Kido.

Mirror Shinji
 is Shinji Kido's Mirror World doppelganger who appears exclusively in the film Kamen Rider Ryuki: Episode Final. As a child, Yui Kanzaki met and befriended Shinji Kido, but was seemingly abandoned by him, which led to her unconsciously creating a Mirror World version of him. Similarly to humans and the Mirror World, Mirror Shinji cannot survive in the real world without disintegrating. To achieve his goal, Mirror Shinji absorbs the original, but Shinji forces him out and fights back, eventually killing his doppelganger.

In combat, Mirror Shinji possesses the  gauntlet, which allows him to summon Dragblacker, black versions of Ryuki's weapons, and perform his own version of the Dragon Rider Kick with the appropriate Advent Cards.

Mirror Shinji Kido is portrayed by Takamasa Suga, who also portrays the original Shinji Kido.

Itsuro Takamizawa
 is a rich and charismatic businessman of the Takamizawa Group who appears exclusively in an alternate timeline depicted in Kamen Rider Ryuki Special: 13 Riders. Having joined the Rider War to expand his wealth further and formed a contract with the anthropomorphic chameleon-like Mirror Monster  to become , he conspires with several of his fellow competitors to kill Shinji Kido. After killing Kamen Rider Raia, Takamizawa is killed in turn by Kamen Rider Knight.

In combat, Takamizawa possesses the left thigh-mounted , which allows him to summon Biogreeza, the  yo-yo, turn invisible, assume other Riders' forms and weapons, and perform the  finisher alongside Biogreeza with the appropriate Advent Cards.

References

Ryuki
Kamen Rider Ryuki